Flight 954 may refer to

Olympic Airways Flight 954, crashed on 8 December 1969
Delta Airlines Flight 954, runway collision on 20 December 1972

0954